Paroles ("Words") is a collection of poems by Jacques Prévert, first published in 1946.

Lawrence Ferlinghetti's translation of 44 poems from this collection was published by Penguin in the 1960s, under the title Selections from Paroles.

It was ranked 16th in Le Monde's 100 Books of the Century.

References 

1946 books
French poetry collections
20th-century French literature